Archie A. Peck (November 22, 1894 – September 15, 1978) was a soldier in the United States Army who received the Medal of Honor for his actions during World War I. While serving as an infantryman in the U.S. 77th Division during the Meuse–Argonne offensive, his unit found itself surrounded in the German lines. The unit would subsequently gain the moniker "The Lost Battalion" as a result of this incident. This was the bloodiest battle of the war involving U.S. troops. Private Peck acted gallantly while surrounded, saving two wounded men under machine gun fire.

Biography 
Peck was born in Tyrone, New York on November 22, 1894, and died September 15, 1978. He is buried in Evergreen Cemetery Sinclairville, New York.

Medal of Honor Citation 

Rank and organization: Private, U.S. Army, Company A, 307th Infantry, 77th Division. Place and date: In the Argonne Forest, France, 6 October 1918. Entered service at: Hornell, N.Y. Birth: November 22, 1894; Tyrone, N.Y. General Orders: War Department, General Orders No. 16, January 22, 1919.

Citation:

For conspicuous gallantry and intrepidity above and beyond the call of duty in action with the enemy in the Argonne Forest, France, on October 6, 1918. While engaged with two other soldiers on patrol duty, Private Peck and his comrades were subjected to the direct fire of an enemy machine gun, at which time both his companions were wounded. Returning to his company, he obtained another soldier to accompany him to assist in bringing in the wounded men. His assistant was killed in the exploit, but he continued on, twice returning safely bringing in both men, being under terrific machinegun fire during the entire Journey.

Military Awards 

Peck's military decorations and awards include:

See also 

 List of Medal of Honor recipients
 List of Medal of Honor recipients for World War I

References

External links 

United States Army Medal of Honor recipients
United States Army non-commissioned officers
People from Schuyler County, New York
1894 births
1978 deaths
World War I recipients of the Medal of Honor
United States Army personnel of World War I
Military personnel from New York (state)
Burials in New York (state)